George Trapp (1948–2002) was an American basketball player

George Trapp may also refer to:

 George Trapp (educator) (1906–1996), Scottish scientist and educator
 George Joseph Trapp (1909–2002), Canadian educator and politician
 George Leonard Trapp (1894–1917), Canadian flying ace during World War II
 Georg von Trapp (1880–1947), Austro-Hungarian Navy officer

See also 
 George Rapp, founder of a religious sect